The Anqing Sports Centre is a sports venue in Yixiu District, Anqing, Anhui, China. It comprises a multi-purpose stadium named Anqing Sports Centre Stadium with a seating capacity of 40,000, a 2000-seat natatorium, and a sports school. It was the main venue of the 13th Anhui Provincial Games in 2014.

References

Football venues in China
Multi-purpose stadiums in China
Buildings and structures in Anqing
Sports venues in Anhui